Polyploca is a genus of moths belonging to the subfamily Thyatirinae of the Drepanidae.

Species
 Polyploca korbi Rebel, 1901
 Polyploca laororshanae Laszlo, G.Ronkay, L.Ronkay & Witt, 2006
 Polyploca latens Laszlo, G.Ronkay, L.Ronkay & Witt, 2008
 Polyploca ridens Fabricius, 1787
 Polyploca ruficollis Schiffermüller & Denis, 1776

Former species
 Polyploca anguligera Hampson, 1893
 Polyploca bifasciata Hampson, 1895
 Polyploca castaneata Warren, 1915
 Polyploca curvicosta Warren, 1915
 Polyploca galema Swinhoe, 1894
 Polyploca hoerburgeri Schawerda, 1924
 Polyploca honei Sick, 1941
 Polyploca neoridens Parenzan, 1976
 Polyploca nigrofascicula Graeser, 1888
 Polyploca nigripunctata Warren, 1915
 Polyploca nigropunctata Sick, 1941
 Polyploca semiobsoleta Warren, 1915
 Polyploca singularis Houlbert, 1921

References

 , 1821, Verzeichniss bekannter Schmettlinge (sic): 273
 , 2007, Esperiana Buchreihe zur Entomologie'' Band 13: 1-683 
, 2006:  The Drepanoidea of Israel: Distribution, Phenology and Ecology (Lepidoptera: Thyatiridae and Drepanidae), with description of a new species. Entomofauna 27(4): 57-76.

Thyatirinae
Drepanidae genera